is the capital city of Ehime Prefecture, on the island of Shikoku, in Japan and is also Shikoku's largest city. , the city had an estimated population of 505,948 in 243541 households and a population density of 1200 persons per km².

Geography
Matsuyama is located in central Ehime Prefecture, facing the Seto Inland Sea to the north, the mountains of the Takanawa Peninsula to the north and east, and the Saragamine Mountain Range, an extension of the Shikoku Mountains, to the south. It is located on the northeastern portion of the Dōgo Plain. The city also includes the Kutsuna Islands, an archipelago of 29 islands in the Seto Inland Sea.

Neighbouring municipalities 
Ehime Prefecture
 Tōon
Imabari
Tobe
Masaki
 Kumakōgen

Climate
Matsuyama has a humid subtropical climate (Köppen climate classification Cfa; Trewartha climate classification Cf) with hot summers and cool winters. Precipitation is significant throughout the year, and is heavier from April to July as well as in September..

Demographics
Per Japanese census data, the population of Matsuyama has been increasing steadily since the 1940s.

History 
The area of Uwajima was part of ancient Iyo Province. Dōgo Onsen was already famous in the Asuka period, and Shōtoku Taishi visited the spa in the year 596. It is also mentioned in passing in The Tale of Genji. At the end of the Heian period, Kōno Michinobu supported Minamoto no Yoritomo against the Heike clan during the Genpei War and was awarded with a position as shugo of Iyo Province. In the Muromachi period, the clan made their stronghold at Yuzuki Castle, near Dōgo Onsen, and developed the port of Mitsuhama to the west to link the area to Honshū and Kyūshū. The clan was conquered by Toyotomi Hideyoshi during his invasion of Shikoku, and later the area became part of Iyo-Matsuyama Domain under the Tokugawa shogunate. A jōkamachi developed around  Matsuyama Castle, and this is the core of the modern city. The city was established with the creation of the modern municipality system on December 15, 1889. The city was bombed on July 26, 1945 in the final stages of World War II, with 251 civilians killed and over 55% of the city area destroyed.

In the twentieth century, various mergers joined Matsuyama with neighboring towns of Dōgo, Mitsuhama, and other townships, aided by urban sprawl, creating a seamless modern city that now ranks as the largest in Shikoku. On October 1, 2018 Matsuyama absorbed the city of Hōjō, and town of Nakajima (from the former Onsen District).

Government
Matsuyama has a mayor-council form of government with a directly elected mayor and a unicameral city council of 42 members. Matsuyama, together with Kumakōgen, contributes 16 members to the Ehime Prefectural Assembly. In terms of national politics, the city is split between Ehime 1st district And Ehime 2nd district of the lower house of the Diet of Japan.

Economy
Matsuyama is a major regional commercial center. Key industries include agriculture represented by mandarin oranges, tourism centered around Dōgo Onsen and Matsuyama Castle, and manufacturing centered on chemical fibers. Industrial areas spread along the coast near airports and harbors, including the Teijin Group's largest production base, and factories of Miura (boiler manufacturer), Iseki (tractor and engine equipment), Hatada Ichiroku (Japanese style confectionery), Poem, a food processing division of Pom (Ehime Drink Company), and the retailing companies Fuji and Daiki all have their headquarters in Matsuyama.

Education

Universities and colleges
Ehime University
Matsuyama Junior College
Matsuyama University
Matsuyama Shinonome College
St. Catherine University

Primary and secondary education
Matsuyama has 62 public elementary schools and 31 public middle schools operated by the city government.  The city has seven public high schools operated by the Ehime Prefectural Board of Education, including the Ehime Prefectural Matsuyama Central Senior High School and the Ehime Prefectural Matsuyama Higashi High School and two national high schools operated by Ehime University. There are two private combined middle/high schools and 11 private high schools. The prefecture also operates two special education schools for the handicapped.

International schools
Matsuyama has one North Korean school (Chōsen gakkō), the

Transportation

Airports

Matsuyama Airport, with flights to Tokyo, Seoul, Shanghai, and various other cities.

Railways 
 Shikoku Railway Company - Yosan Line
  -  -  -  -  -  -  -  -  -  - 
 Iyotetsu - Takahama Line
  -  -  -  -  -  -  -  -  - 
 Iyotetsu - Yokogawara Line
  -  -  -  -  -  -  -  - 
 Iyotetsu - Gunchū Line
  -  -  -  -

Trams
Iyo Railway also operates a system of trams and buses that serve as the city's main modes of public transportation. Matsuyama is one of the few Japanese cities that did not do away with its original tram system, which has been continually operated since 1887. 
 Jōhoku Line: Komachi — Heiwadōri 1
 Jōnan Line:  Dōgo Onsen — Nishi-Horibata, Kamiichiman — Heiwadōri 1
 Honmachi Line: Nishi-Horibata — Hommachi 6
 Ōtemachi Line: Nishi-Horibata — JR Matsuyama Station — Komachi
 Hanazono Line: Matsuyama City Station — Minami-Horibata

Highways 
  Matsuyama Expressway

Ports
Port of Matsuyama, with regular ferry service to Hiroshima and regular night ferries to Kobe, Kokurakita-ku, Kitakyūshū, and several other destinations. Also, a hydrofoil service exists between Hiroshima and a few other destinations.

Sister cities
Matsuyama has three sister cities, as designated by Sister Cities International: 
  Sacramento, California, United States
  Freiburg, Baden-Württemberg, Germany
  Pyeongtaek, Gyeonggi, South Korea
  Taipei, Taiwan, friendship city since 2016

Local attractions

The city is known for its hot springs (onsen), among the oldest in Japan, and is home to the Dōgo Onsen Honkan, a Meiji Period wooden public bathhouse dating from 1894. A second favorite tourist spot is Matsuyama Castle. Eight of the eighty-eight temples in the Shikoku Pilgrimage are in Matsuyama.

Buddhist temples in Matsuyama include Ishite-ji (石手寺), Taisan-ji (太山寺), and Jōdo-ji (浄土寺), all dating back to the 8th century, although the oldest surviving buildings are from the early 14th century, as well as Hōgon-ji (宝厳寺), Taihō-ji (大宝寺) and Enmyō-ji (円明寺). Shrines of the city include Isaniwa Jinja (伊佐爾波神社), built in 1667.

The haiku poet Masaoka Shiki lived in Matsuyama. His house, now known as the Shiki-do, and a museum, the Shiki Memorial Museum, are popular attractions, and the centerpieces of the city's claim as a center of the international haiku movement. Other haiku poets associated with Matsuyama include Kurita Chodō, whose Kōshin-an was visited by Kobayashi Issa, Shiki's followers, Takahama Kyoshi and Kawahigashi Hekigoto, and Taneda Santōka. Santoka's house, known as Isso-an, is also a tourist attraction and is periodically open to the public. The Matsuyama Declaration of 1999 proposed the formation of the International Haiku Research Center, and the first Masaoka Shiki International Haiku Awards were given in 2000. Recipients have included Yves Bonnefoy (2000), Cor van den Heuvel (2002) and Gary Snyder (2004).

The famed novel Botchan by Natsume Sōseki is set in Matsuyama. As a result, there are numerous sites and locales named after the main character, including Botchan Stadium, the Botchan Ressha (an antique train that runs on the city's tramway), and Botchan dango.

Matsuyama also figures in several works by Shiba Ryōtarō, notably his popular novel, Saka no Ue no Kumo [Clouds Above the Hill] (1969).  In anticipation of the upcoming NHK Taiga drama adaptation of Saka no Ue no Kumo, a Saka no Ue no Kumo Museum was established in 2007.

Matsuyama was also the setting of a 1907 novel about the Russo-Japanese War, As the Hague Ordains, by American writer Eliza Ruhamah Scidmore. Matsuyama figures in the novel because the city housed a camp for Russian prisoners during the war. A Russian cemetery commemorates this important episode in Matsuyama history. The Russo-Japanese War is also remembered in Matsuyama because of the contributions of two Japanese military leaders, the Akiyama brothers, Akiyama Saneyuki and Akiyama Yoshifuru, who were born in the city.

Matsuyama has several important museums.  The Museum of Art, Ehime is the city's main art museum, its collections emphasizing the works of regional artists.  The Shiki Memorial Museum is a museum that focuses on the life and work of Masaoka Shiki, with special attention to his contribution to haiku. The Saka no Ue no Kumo Museum features exhibits connected with the novel and television series.  There is a Juzo Itami museum dedicated to the film director.

Products (meibutsu) of Matsuyama include tarts and Botchan dango. In the 17th century, the lord of Matsuyama castle Sadayuki Matsudaira (松平定行) introduced the process of tart-making, originally brought to Japan by the Portuguese, to Matsuyama. At first it was a Castella with jam. According to legend Sadayuki made some changes, such as adding red bean paste. Now there are many kinds and makers of tarts in Matsuyama; some add yuzu paste or chestnut to the red bean paste. In addition to tarts, Botchan dango is also a product of Matsuyama. Botchan dango was named after the novel Botchan by Natsume Sōseki. It consists of three bean paste beads of three flavors, matcha, egg, and red bean paste.  Within the paste is contained mochi.

Matsuyama is the site of a number of festivals, including the Dogo Festival, held in the spring, the Matsuyama Festival, held in August, and the Fall Festival, held in October, which features battling mikoshi.

Sports
The city is represented in the J. League of football with its local club, Ehime FC.  The Ehime Mandarin Pirates also represent the city in the baseball Shikoku Island League Plus.

Notable people from Matsuyama

Kenta Abe, baseball player
Akiyama Saneyuki, admiral in the Imperial Japanese Navy
Akiyama Yoshifuru, general in the Imperial Japanese Army
Kotomi Aoki, manga artist
Ryō Aono, snowboarder
Sidney Gulick, missionary
Harada Sanosuke, 10th unit captain of the Shinsengumi
Tomoko Honda, announcer
Ippen, Buddhist preacher
Juzo Itami, film director
Mansaku Itami,  film director
Masaru Kageura, baseball player
Katō Yoshiaki, daimyō
Kurita Chodō, haiku poet
Chiaki Kusuhara, beach volleyball player
Loveli, fashion model and television personality
Kanako Murata, Professional mixed martial artist 
Alan Shirahama, performer, actor, and DJ
Masaoka Shiki, poet
Hideki Matsuyama, golfer
Yōko Matsuyama, actress
Yasuyuki Muneta, judoka
Riki Nakaya, judoka
Kenzaburō Ōe, writer
Nathaniel Rosen, cellist
Mika Saiki, beach volleyball player
Koshiro Shimada, Figure Skater
Hisui Sugiura, graphic designer
Kyoshi Takahama, poet
Makoto Tamada, motorcycle racer
Tadao Tannaka, mathematician
Taneda Santōka, haiku poet
Toshirō Tomochika, football player and politician
Reiko Tosa, athlete
Tetsu Yano, writer

See also
Matsuyama tengu (Noh play)
Rakuzan ware (Ehime)
Songshan District, Taipei, named after Matsuyama

References

External links

 Matsuyama City official website 
 Matsuyama City official website 
 Sophia Club An NPO that creates a friendly environment for foreigners
 Matsuyama Declaration
 CityMayors.com city profile by Mayor Nakamura

 
Cities in Ehime Prefecture
Port settlements in Japan
Populated coastal places in Japan